Mirko Aleksić (Serbian Cyrillic: Мирко Алексић; born 26 September 1977) is a Serbian former professional footballer who played as a midfielder.

Aleksić spent the majority of his playing career with Vojvodina and Obilić, collecting over 150 appearances in the First League of Serbia and Montenegro. He also had a short spell abroad in Cyprus.

External links
 
 

Association football midfielders
Cypriot First Division players
Ethnikos Achna FC players
Expatriate footballers in Cyprus
First League of Serbia and Montenegro players
FK Borac Čačak players
FK Novi Pazar players
FK Obilić players
FK Proleter Novi Sad players
FK Smederevo players
FK Vojvodina players
FK Voždovac players
FK Zemun players
Serbia and Montenegro expatriate footballers
Serbia and Montenegro footballers
Serbia and Montenegro expatriate sportspeople in Cyprus
Serbian First League players
Serbian footballers
Serbian SuperLiga players
Footballers from Novi Sad
1977 births
Living people